The Greater Dayton Regional Transit Authority, formerly known as the Miami Valley RTA, is a public transit agency that generally serves the greater Dayton, Ohio area. The GDRTA serves communities within Montgomery County and parts of Greene County, Ohio, USA. There are 31 routes. RTA operates diesel and electric trolley buses seven days a week, 21 hours a day, and provides services to many citizens within the area. RTA's current CEO is Bob Ruzinsky.

Greater Dayton RTA is Ohio’s fourth-largest public transit system, serving Dayton and 23 surrounding communities in Montgomery County and parts of Greene County. RTA provides more than 11 million passenger trips per year on its buses.

History 

The Miami Valley Regional Transit Authority (now the Greater Dayton Regional Transit Authority, or RTA) took over public transit operations in November 1972. In 2003, its Board of Trustees voted to change the transit agency's name to the Greater Dayton Regional Transit Authority.

Trolley buses 

One notable feature of the GDRTA system is its use of electric trolley buses. Only five cities in the United States currently have electric trolley buses: Boston, Dayton, Philadelphia, San Francisco and Seattle. The first electric trolley bus (ETB) operation in Ohio occurred in Dayton, on April 23, 1933, when the Linden–Salem line was converted from streetcars to trackless trolleys — or trolley buses, as they are most commonly known today. The RTA renewed its commitment to electric transit with a Board of Trustees vote to continue the trolley bus service in 1991, and the purchase of a new fleet of ETBs from Electric Transit, Inc., a joint venture of the Czech company Skoda and the U.S. company AAI Corporation, based on Skoda's model 14Tr. Final assembly of the vehicles took place in Dayton in 1995–98. In 2014, the system added its first low-floor trolley buses, with four dual-mode prototypes purchased from Vossloh Kiepe (now Kiepe Electric) and using bodies from Gillig, for testing and evaluation.  In January 2018, RTA placed an order with Kiepe for 26 production-series dual-mode trolley buses to the same design as the prototypes, with Gillig low-floor bodies, for delivery starting in 2019.

Electric streetcar service in Dayton had started in 1888, and it continued through to, and indeed beyond, the start of trolley bus service. Therefore, electric transit service has been operated continuously in Dayton since 1888, which is longer than in any other city in the United States.

Hybrid buses 

With the addition of environmentally friendly hybrid buses in 2010 to the GDRTA's fleet, the GDRTA is Ohio's greenest transit fleet. In September 2010 RTA was designated the only 5-star Ohio Green Fleet by Clean Fuels Ohio.

Hubs 

The RTA operates five bus "hubs", or transit centers. Each hub serves as a connection to many suburban bus routes around Dayton. The one in downtown Dayton is named Wright Stop Plaza and opened for service on September 1, 2009 (after a ceremonial opening earlier).

Operation 
The RTA operates with diesel and electric trolley buses. Dayton is the smallest city in the United States to still operate electric trolley buses. The trolley buses travel at least five miles on RTA routes serving Dayton and some neighboring suburbs. The routes include: Route 1, Route 2, Route 3, Route 4, Route 5, Route 7 and Route 8. Bus service to Dayton International Airport from downtown Dayton began on 11 August 2013. Service was expanded to stops on Pentagon Boulevard in Beavercreek, allowing access to the Fairfield Commons Mall and Soin Medical Center, on January 12, 2014.

Contributions 
The RTA has been involved in helping the city of Dayton through its contributions to the Dayton Dragons, The Schuster Center, and the Dayton Aviation Heritage National Historical Park.

In addition, RTA passed a resolution to make easier connections to its regional hubs and prevent misuse of transfers. In January 2007, RTA created an established proposal to make all buses serve regional businesses, establish transfer points in designated areas and streamline previously neighborhood routes. The RTA added two routes to serve areas frequently used by passengers. RTA discontinued eight routes in response to overlapping and low passenger counts.

Regular route list 

1 Pentagon Blvd-Wright State University-Third St-Westown TC-Drexel
2 Linden Ave-Eastown TC-Otterbein-Lexington-Northwest TC
3 (Weekday only) Wayne Ave.-Eastown
4 Townview-Hoover-Delphos-Xenia Ave./Linden Ave.-Eastown TC-Westown TC
5 (Weekday only) Valley St-Children's Medical Center-Downtown Dayton-Far Hills
7 North Main St-Shiloh-Downtown Dayton-Watervliet
8 Northwest TC-Salem Ave-Lakeview-Westown TC
9 Northwest TC-Greenwich Village-Derby Rd-Westown
11 Kettering to Woodman (Downtown Dayton – WPAFB Gate 1B) / Kettering to Stroop (Kettering Medical Center – Kettering Rec. Center – The Greene)
12 Five Oaks-Valerie Arms-Forrer Blvd-Dorothy Lane
14 Northwest TC-Trotwood-Centerville
16 Union-Englewood-Kettering-Whipp & Bigger-Clyo Rd.
17 Vandalia-South TC
18 Huber Heights-Moraine-West Carrollton-Miamisburg
19 Huber Heights-Moraine-Miamisburg-South TC
22 Keowee-Northridge-Job Center-Miller Ln-Gateway
23 Eastown TC-Kettering-Centerville-Dayton Mall-South TC
24 Garber Rd-Northwest TC-Westown TC-South TC
34 Miller Ln.-Northwest TC-Westbrook Rd.-MVCTC
42 (Weekday only) Farmersville-Germantown-Miamisburg-South TC
43 Dayton International Airport, Vandalia
60 Dayton Mall-South TC-Miamisburg
64 Senior E-Z Ride (Fridays Only)
65 Senior E-Z Ride (Tues. and Thurs.)
66 Senior E-Z Ride (Mon. and Wed.)
X5 Dayton Mall Express-Downtown Dayton-South TC

References

External links 

Greater Dayton Regional Transit Authority
City of Dayton official site

Bus transportation in Ohio
Transportation in Montgomery County, Ohio
Transportation in Greene County, Ohio
Wright State University
Transportation in Dayton, Ohio
Trolleybus transport in the United States
Transit agencies in Ohio
1972 establishments in Ohio